Frederick Lubin (born 23 August 2004) is a British racing driver of American descent scheduled to compete in the FIA World Endurance Championship for United Autosports.

Early career

F4 British Championship 
After beginning his karting career at the comparatively late age of 14, Lubin made his single-seater debut in the F4 British Championship in 2020, partnering Alex Connor and Roman Bilinski as the only rookie at the TRS Arden Junior Team. He started off the season with relative success, scoring points in all three races at Donington Park. However, Lubin was unable to score another hattrick of points until the fifth round of the campaign at Thruxton. After an off in the first Silverstone race Lubin did not finish a race outside of a points-scoring position again, leading him on to take ninth in the standings at the end of the year. In addition, he also managed to win six races in the rookie cup and came second in that class, only losing out to Christian Mansell.

GB3 Championship 
In 2021 Lubin progressed to the BRDC British Formula 3 Championship. He remained with Arden and was once again joined by Alex Connor. The Brit once again started his campaign in convincing fashion, getting two fourth-placed finishes in the second race at Brands Hatch and Silverstone respectively, and was even outscoring his teammate at that time. Before the third round however, Lubin had to withdraw following a diagnosis that he had myocarditis, rendering him unable to compete. He returned for the fifth event, held at the Snetterton Circuit, where he would finish all three races in the top eight, with a best finish of fifth in race two. Throughout the following rounds the Briton would continue scoring regular top-ten-finishes, before finishing off the campaign by taking a pair of podiums at the final two reversed-grid races of the year. This pair of third places would elevate Lubin to eleventh in the standings.

Euroformula Open 
Having competed in three rounds of the Formula Regional Asian Championship with Evans GP at the start of 2022, Lubin made a move to the Euroformula Open Championship with Team Motopark. Two runner-up finishes in the opening round at Estoril brought a strong start to the campaign, although Lubin would be unable to take a place on the rostrum until Race 1 in Hungary, by which stage he had fallen far behind championship leader and teammate Oliver Goethe. More podiums came in Imola and Monza, before the Briton won the final race of the season in Barcelona, thus taking his first victory in single-seater racing and finishing fourth in the drivers' championship.

Sportscar career 
At the end of 2022, Lubin took his maiden step into sportscar racing, teaming up with Vector Sport during the post-season test of the FIA World Endurance Championship at the Bahrain Circuit.

Going into the 2023 season, it would be announced that Lubin would compete for United Autosports in the WEC.

Karting record

Karting career summary

Racing record

Racing career summary 

* Season still in progress.

Complete F4 British Championship results
(key) (Races in bold indicate pole position) (Races in italics indicate fastest lap)

Complete GB3 Championship results 
(key) (Races in bold indicate pole position) (Races in italics indicate fastest lap)

Complete Formula Regional Asian Championship results
(key) (Races in bold indicate pole position) (Races in italics indicate the fastest lap of top ten finishers)

Complete Euroformula Open Championship results 
(key) (Races in bold indicate pole position; races in italics indicate points for the fastest lap of top ten finishers)

Complete FIA World Endurance Championship results

References

External links 

 

2004 births
Living people
British people of American descent
English racing drivers
British F4 Championship drivers
Arden International drivers
Formula Regional Asian Championship drivers
BRDC British Formula 3 Championship drivers
Euroformula Open Championship drivers
Motopark Academy drivers
British people of Japanese descent
FIA World Endurance Championship drivers
United Autosports drivers